Dadu Mahendranath Singh was an Indian politician from the state of the Madhya Pradesh.
He represented Seoni Vidhan Sabha constituency in Madhya Pradesh Legislative Assembly by winning General election of 1951, 1957.

References 

Year of birth missing
Possibly living people
Madhya Pradesh MLAs 1952–1957
Madhya Pradesh MLAs 1957–1962
People from Seoni, Madhya Pradesh
Indian National Congress politicians from Madhya Pradesh